Mills Valley is a basin along the Sevier River in southeastern Juab County, Utah, United States. It contains a number of geological faults and springs, and contains a population of Least Chub.

See also

 List of valleys of Utah

References

External links

Valleys of Utah
Landforms of Juab County, Utah